In the geometry of hyperbolic 3-space, the dodecahedral-icosahedral honeycomb is a uniform honeycomb, constructed from dodecahedron, icosahedron, and icosidodecahedron cells, in a rhombicosidodecahedron vertex figure.

Images
Wide-angle perspective views:

Related honeycombs

Rectified dodecahedral-icosahedral honeycomb 

The rectified dodecahedral-icosahedral honeycomb is a compact uniform honeycomb, constructed from icosidodecahedron and rhombicosidodecahedron cells, in a cuboid vertex figure. It has a Coxeter diagram .

Perspective view from center of rhombicosidodecahedron

Cyclotruncated dodecahedral-icosahedral honeycomb 

The cyclotruncated dodecahedral-icosahedral honeycomb is a compact uniform honeycomb, constructed from truncated dodecahedron and icosahedron cells, in a pentagonal antiprism vertex figure. It has a Coxeter diagram .

Perspective view from center of icosahedron

Cyclotruncated icosahedral-dodecahedral honeycomb 

The cyclotruncated icosahedral-dodecahedral honeycomb is a compact uniform honeycomb, constructed from dodecahedron and truncated icosahedron cells, in a triangular antiprism vertex figure. It has a Coxeter diagram .

Perspective view from center of dodecahedron

It can be seen as somewhat analogous to the pentahexagonal tiling, which has pentagonal and hexagonal faces:

Truncated dodecahedral-icosahedral honeycomb 

The truncated dodecahedral-icosahedral honeycomb is a compact uniform honeycomb, constructed from truncated icosahedron, truncated dodecahedron, rhombicosidodecahedron, and truncated icosidodecahedron cells, in a trapezoidal pyramid vertex figure. It has a Coxeter diagram .

Perspective view from center of truncated icosahedron

Omnitruncated dodecahedral-icosahedral honeycomb 

The omnitruncated dodecahedral-icosahedral honeycomb is a compact uniform honeycomb, constructed from truncated icosidodecahedron cells, in a rhombic disphenoid vertex figure. It has a Coxeter diagram .

Perspective view from center of truncated icosidodecahedron

See also 
 Convex uniform honeycombs in hyperbolic space
 List of regular polytopes

References 
Coxeter, Regular Polytopes, 3rd. ed., Dover Publications, 1973. . (Tables I and II: Regular polytopes and honeycombs, pp. 294–296)
Coxeter, The Beauty of Geometry: Twelve Essays, Dover Publications, 1999  (Chapter 10: Regular honeycombs in hyperbolic space, Summary tables II,III,IV,V, p212-213)
 Jeffrey R. Weeks The Shape of Space, 2nd edition  (Chapter 16-17: Geometries on Three-manifolds I,II)
 Norman Johnson Uniform Polytopes, Manuscript
 N.W. Johnson: The Theory of Uniform Polytopes and Honeycombs, Ph.D. Dissertation, University of Toronto, 1966 
 N.W. Johnson: Geometries and Transformations, (2018) Chapter 13: Hyperbolic Coxeter groups

Honeycombs (geometry)